INS Parundu is an Indian naval air station located near Uchipuli in the Ramanathapuram of the state of Tamil Nadu. It operates under the Eastern Naval Command of the Indian Navy. The air station will be opened up for civilian flights under Phase 2 of the Regional Connectivity Scheme (RCS) of the Government of India also known as UDAN and the Airports Authority of India (AAI) has started preparatory work at the airstrip. It is sandwiched between Rameswaram National Highway Road and Railway track which leads towards Rameswaram.

History
The airfield in Ramanathapuram was previously the abandoned Ramnad Civil Aerodrome. Naval aviation first utilised the facilities in 1982, to monitor the Palk Strait in the wake of the Sri Lankan Civil War.

The facilities were fully transferred to the Navy on 9 June 1985, and the naval air station was initially commissioned INS Rajali II.

On 26 March 2009, the base was renamed and commissioned as INS Parundu, for the Tamil word for an eagle. The facilities have since been upgraded to operate larger aircraft. It is primarily used by the navy as a reconnaissance station to monitor the South East Bay of Bengal, the northern Indian Ocean, the Gulf of Mannar and the Palk Strait.

On 25 August 2017, an Integrated Automatic Aviation Meteorological System (IAAMS) was added.

Units
The primary units based at INS Parundu are Naval Air Squadrons (INAS) that operate HAL Chetak helicopters, Islander and Dornier 228 reconnaissance aircraft.

Besides upgrading the runway, the Navy has installed dedicated facilities to operate UAVs from the air station. INAS 344, operating IAI Heron and IAI Searcher Mk II UAVs is based at INS Parundu.

See also
 Indian navy 
 List of Indian Navy bases
 List of active Indian Navy ships

 Integrated commands and units
 Armed Forces Special Operations Division
 Defence Cyber Agency
 Integrated Defence Staff
 Integrated Space Cell
 Indian Nuclear Command Authority
 Indian Armed Forces
 Special Forces of India

 Other lists
 Strategic Forces Command
 List of Indian Air Force stations
 List of Indian Navy bases
 India's overseas military bases

References

Parundu
Airports in Tamil Nadu
1982 establishments in Tamil Nadu
Airports established in 1982
Military installations established in 1982
20th-century architecture in India